Wang Chin-yu is a Taiwanese taekwondo practitioner. She won a silver medal in middleweight at the 1987 World Taekwondo Championships, after being defeated by Mandy de Jongh in the final. She won a bronze medal at the 1986 Asian Taekwondo Championships in Darwin, Australia.

References

External links

Year of birth missing (living people)
Living people
Taiwanese female taekwondo practitioners
World Taekwondo Championships medalists
Asian Taekwondo Championships medalists
20th-century Taiwanese women